Ole Luckow (born 28 November 1989) is a German darts player currently playing in Professional Darts Corporation events.

Luckow first qualified for a PDC European Tour event in 2019, the 2019 International Darts Open, where he will play Davy Van Baelen.

References

External links

Living people
German darts players
Professional Darts Corporation associate players
1989 births